Andrei Sychevoi (born May 16, 1969) is a Russian military officer and Lieutenant General of the Russian Armed Forces.

On 20 July 2022 during the 2022 Russian invasion of Ukraine, Sergei Shoigu, the Minister of Defence of Russia, appointed Sychevoi commander of Russian forces of the Western Military District, replacing Colonel General Alexander Zhuravlyov, who was removed after the initial phases of the war. Sychevoi was reportedly dismissed from the post by 4 September 2022.

In early September 2022, it was speculated that Sychevoi had been captured by Ukrainian forces in Kharkiv. It was believed by some to be Sychevoi due to the captured officer looking similar in appearance. However it was never fully proven or determined to in fact be Sychevoi who was captured.

References

1969 births
Living people
People from Krymsky District
Russian lieutenant generals
Russian military personnel of the Syrian civil war
Russian military personnel of the 2022 Russian invasion of Ukraine
Military Academy of the General Staff of the Armed Forces of the Soviet Union alumni
Recipients of the Medal of the Order "For Merit to the Fatherland" II class
Recipients of the Medal of the Order "For Merit to the Fatherland" I class
20th-century Russian military personnel
21st-century Russian military personnel
Russian individuals subject to European Union sanctions